John Andrew Long (1869–1941) was a unionist politician in Northern Ireland.

Long worked as a farmer and served on various public boards before his election as an Ulster Unionist member of the Senate of Northern Ireland in 1921, serving until his death in 1941. He was Deputy Leader of the Senate and Parliamentary Secretary in the Department of the Prime Minister from 1930 to 1941.

References

1869 births
1941 deaths
Ulster Unionist Party members of the Senate of Northern Ireland
Members of the Senate of Northern Ireland 1921–1925
Members of the Senate of Northern Ireland 1925–1929
Members of the Senate of Northern Ireland 1929–1933
Members of the Senate of Northern Ireland 1933–1937
Members of the Senate of Northern Ireland 1937–1941
Northern Ireland junior government ministers (Parliament of Northern Ireland)